Samuel S. Whallon (April 20, 1804 Argyle, Washington County, New York - July 6, 1858 Erie, Erie County, Pennsylvania) was an American merchant and politician from New York.

Life
About 1812. his family removed to Mayville, New York. In 1834, he was one of the co-founders of the Mayville Sentinel, but already the next year the newspaper was sold.

He was a member of the New York State Assembly (Chautauqua Co., 1st D.) in 1855.

He was a Canal Commissioner from 1856 until his death, elected at the 1855 New York state election on the American Party ticket.

He died of scarlet fever.

Sources
 Obit in NYT on July 8, 1858 {gives July 6 as death date]
 Political Graveyard
The New York Civil List compiled by Franklin Benjamin Hough (pages 42, 248 and 315; Weed, Parsons and Co., 1858)
Annual Obituary Notices of Eminent Persons who Have Died in the United States: For 1857-1858 compiled by Nathan Crosby (Phillips, Sampson and Co., 1859; page 377) [gives July 6 as death date, and gives wrong election year for canal commissioner "1856" (he was elected in 1855)]
The New York Civil List compiled by Franklin Benjamin Hough, Stephen C. Hutchins and Edgar Albert Werner (1867; page 406) [gives July 5 as death date]

1804 births
1858 deaths
People from Mayville, New York
Erie Canal Commissioners
People from Argyle, New York
Members of the New York State Assembly
New York (state) Know Nothings
19th-century American politicians
Deaths from streptococcus infection